Duck Creek Hundred is a hundred in Kent County, Delaware, United States. Duck Creek Hundred was formed in 1682 as one of the original Delaware Hundreds. Its primary community is Smyrna.

References

Hundreds in Kent County, Delaware